Kamil Witkowski (born 9 December 1984 in Lublin) is a Polish footballer who played as a forward for Polish First League side Znicz Pruszkow.

Witkowski played high school soccer in the United States for Bishop Kearney High School in Rochester, New York, USA. He scored 110 goals in four years at Kearney, which puts him at number seven on the all-time scoring list in Section V.

References

 Kamil Witkowski at Internet encyclopedia KS Cracovia

1984 births
Living people
MKS Cracovia (football) players
Polish footballers
Sportspeople from Lublin

Association football forwards